John P. Lowenhaupt is an American former basketball player at the College of William & Mary in Williamsburg, Virginia.

College of William & Mary
A 6'5" small forward, Lowenhaupt ranks among the top all-time in the state of Virginia for men's collegiate Division I basketball scoring. He holds career averages of 16.0 points on 54.1% shooting in 112 games played. Years later his jersey was retired at the College, making him one of only six players to have this honor. He finished third in career points at William & Mary with 1,866 during his tenure. Lowenhaupt trails only Marcus Thornton (2,178), Chet Giermak (2,052), Nathan Knight, and Jeff Cohen (2,003) at their alma mater for most ever. During his career with the Tribe, Lowenhaupt garnered many accolades.

Later life
Lowenhaupt became an accountant and still lives in Williamsburg, Virginia with his wife, Betty Joyce, and three children; Tucker, Bailey, and Jordan. Bruce Hornsby's song, Rainbow's Cadillac, was written about Lowenhaupt's time at William & Mary.   He is CEO of his own business, John Lowenhaupt, CPA.

References

Living people
American men's basketball players
Archbishop Molloy High School alumni
Basketball players from New York City
Sportspeople from Williamsburg, Virginia
Small forwards
William & Mary Tribe men's basketball players
Year of birth missing (living people)